Tommi Jokinen is a Finnish professional ice hockey player currently attached to UK Elite Ice Hockey League (EIHL) side Fife Flyers. He previously played for HC 21 Prešov of the Slovak Extraliga.

Jokinen also previously played for KalPa and SaiPa of the Liiga.

Career statistics

Regular season and playoffs

References

External links

Living people
KalPa players
SaiPa players
1988 births
Fife Flyers players
Finnish ice hockey forwards
HC 21 Prešov players
Nottingham Panthers players
Finnish expatriate ice hockey players in Slovakia
Finnish expatriate ice hockey players in England
Finnish expatriate ice hockey players in Scotland